The Amazon Tall Tower Observatory or ATTO (in Portuguese: Observatório de Torre Alta da Amazônia) is a scientific research facility in the Amazon rainforest of Brazil. The site's infrastructure includes a  tower that extends far above the forest canopy and two  towers that allow researchers to collect samples from the soil surface to above the forest canopy. Additionally, there are container-labs, a base camp and nearby sites for studying vegetation and soil processes. The tall research tower is one meter taller than the Eiffel Tower and is currently the tallest structure in South America. All towers are equipped with a broad range of instruments to measure chemical and physical properties of the atmosphere, such as greenhouse gas concentrations, aerosols and meteorological data.

Description 
The observatory is a joint project between Germany and Brazil coordinated by the Max Planck Institute for Biogeochemistry on the German side and the Brazilian National Institute of Amazonian Research, INPA (Instituto Nacional de Pesquisas da Amazônia) on the Brazilian side. Other major research partners include the Max Planck Institute for Chemistry and the University of the State of Amazonas (UEA, Universidade do Estado do Amazonas), with over 20 research institutes and universities in Brazil, Germany and other countries participating. The initial building cost of 8.4 million Euros was shared about equally by the German and Brazil partners.

The site is located remotely deep within the Amazon rainforest. The towers are used to study the interactions between the forest and the atmosphere. Greenhouse gases, aerosols and weather, among other data, are measured continuously as well as during field campaigns. They provide information about a roughly  area of largely pristine rainforest. This is especially true during the wet season when the direction brings mostly "clean" air to the site that resembles the pre-industrial atmosphere. During the dry season, the wind direction shifts and puts the ATTO site within the influence of Manaus and the "arc of deforestation" and air pollution is noticeable even here.

ATTO's counterpart “ZOTTO” (Zotino Tall Tower Observation Facility) is located in the Siberian Taiga of Russia.

Research objectives 
The project aims to study large- and smaller scale processes, from how the forest and soil influence greenhouse gases, aerosols, air mixing and clouds, to soil chemistry, microbiology and biodiversity. The main research questions are:

• How does the Amazon forest interact with climate and the water cycle?

• What is the role of the Amazon forest in the global cycles of greenhouse gases such as carbon dioxide, methane, and nitrous oxide?

• How do volatile organic compounds emitted from vegetation and soils affect atmospheric chemistry and the formation of aerosols and clouds?

The project is also dedicated to the exploration of how the rainforest biosphere responds to global warming.

According to the German Federal Ministry of Education and Research (BMBF), ATTO allows to reach new levels of measurements of the complex interactions between the land surface and the atmosphere. Furthermore, the research project will contribute to further our understanding of “climate-relevant chemical and physical processes over the Amazon” and thus create new principles for climate protection.

History 
{
  "type": "FeatureCollection",
  "features": [
    {
      "type": "Feature",
      "properties": {},
      "geometry": {
        "type": "Point",
        "coordinates": [
          -59.005583,
          -2.145933
        ]
      }
    }
  ]
}The project was launched in 2009. The two 80 m towers were operational by 2012. Building of the tall tower began in 2014 and was completed in 2015.

See also 
Zotino Tall Tower Observation Facility, a similar tower in Siberia

References

External links 

Photo essay: Scientists build a tower as tall as the Chrysler building in the middle of the Amazon, PBS.org
Amazon Tall Tower Observatory on The Skyscraper Center
At 1,066 Feet Above Rainforest, A View of the Changing Amazon on Yale Environment 360

Amazon basin
Environmental research
Buildings and structures in Amazonas (Brazilian state)
Environment of Amazonas (Brazilian state)
Guyed masts
Observation towers
Towers in Brazil
Towers completed in 2015
2015 establishments in Brazil